Le Tréhou is a commune in the Finistère department of Brittany in north-western France.

Population
Inhabitants of Le Tréhou are called in French Tréhousiens.

See also
List of the works of Bastien and Henry Prigent
Communes of the Finistère department
Le Tréhou Parish close

References

External links

Official website 

Mayors of Finistère Association 

Communes of Finistère